Gol Darreh (also known as Gul Darreh) is a village in Eshen Rural District, Mehrdasht District, Najafabad County, Isfahan Province, Iran. At the 2006 census, its population was 1,093, in 251 families.

References 

Populated places in Najafabad County